Mats Gunnar "Mördaren" Thelin (born March 30, 1961 in Stockholm, Sweden) is a retired Swedish professional ice hockey defenceman who played 163 games in the National Hockey League for the Boston Bruins.

Career statistics

Regular season and playoffs

International

External links

1961 births
Living people
AIK IF players
Boston Bruins draft picks
Boston Bruins players
Moncton Golden Flames players
Ice hockey people from Stockholm
Swedish ice hockey defencemen
Ice hockey players at the 1984 Winter Olympics
Medalists at the 1984 Winter Olympics
Olympic bronze medalists for Sweden
Olympic ice hockey players of Sweden
Olympic medalists in ice hockey